Landing is a series of flight simulator video games by Taito. Almost all games were released for arcades, except the Jet de Go! Series released for PlayStation consoles.

They are amateur flight simulation arcade video games that run on the Taito Air System and use 3D polygon graphics. They simulate commercial airliners, while utilizing motion simulator cockpit arcade cabinets. Air Inferno (1990) is a spin-off 3D aerial firefighting helicopter simulation running on the same hardware.

Landing series 

 Midnight Landing (arcade, JP May 1987,  June 1987)
 Top Landing (arcade, developed 1987, JP July 7, 1988, EU December 1988, NA January 1989)
 Landing Gear (arcade, worldwide, February 1996)
 Landing High Japan (arcade, worldwide, June 1999)

Related game series and spin-offs 

 Air Inferno (arcade, June 1990)

Jet de Go! series 

 Jet de Go! (PlayStation, Game Boy Color, PC - February 2000)
 Jet de Go! 2 (PlayStation 2, PC - 2002)
 Jet de Go! Pocket (PSP - 2005)

Reception
Midnight Landing was the eighth highest-grossing upright/cockpit arcade game of 1987 in Japan. It was later Japan's sixth highest-grossing dedicated arcade game of 1988.

Top Landing was the fifth highest-grossing dedicated arcade game of 1989 in Japan. It was also a success in Europe, particularly France. In North America, it topped the monthly RePlay chart for new arcade video games in August 1990.

References

Square Enix franchises
Video game franchises
Flight simulation video games
Taito arcade games